Jeffrey Allen Carter  (born December 3, 1964) is a retired Major League Baseball pitcher who played baseball at the University of Tampa. He played during one season at the major league level for the Chicago White Sox. He was drafted by the Montreal Expos in the 19th round of the  amateur draft.

References

1964 births
Living people
American expatriate baseball players in Canada
Baseball players from Tampa, Florida
Birmingham Barons players
Chicago White Sox players
Jacksonville Expos players
Jamestown Expos players
Major League Baseball pitchers
Nashville Sounds players
Rockford Expos players
Tampa Spartans baseball players
Vancouver Canadians players
West Palm Beach Expos players